The Porrentruy–Bonfol railway line is a standard gauge railway line in the canton of Jura, Switzerland. Chemins de fer du Jura owns and operates the line. The line formerly extended to the French border at Pfetterhouse.

History 

The RPB was one of four companies that merged on 1 January 1944 to form the Chemins de fer du Jura, which has owned and operated the line ever since. Cross-border passenger service north of Bonfol ended on 14 February 1946; the line north of Bonfol was abandoned altogether on 4 January 1970. The line from Porrentruy to Bonfol was electrified on 18 May 1952.

Chemins de fer du Jura undertook a rehabilitation of the line between 2020–2022, including new platforms at all three stations and a rebuilding of the bridge over the Allaine.

Service 
 Chemins de fer du Jura operates hourly passenger service over the route, with additional trains during peak-hours on weekdays.

Notes

References

Further reading

External links 
 2022 timetable

Railway lines in Switzerland
Transport in the canton of Jura
Railway lines opened in 1901
15 kV AC railway electrification